Soltszentimre is a  village in Bács-Kiskun County, in the Southern Great Plain region of southern Hungary.

Geography

Soltszentimre homepage

Populated places in Bács-Kiskun County